Valencia History Museum (— MhV) was inaugurated on May 7, 2003.

The mission of the Valencia History Museum is to educate visitors about the historical development of the city of Valencia. The MhV depicts the past of Valencia in an informative and entertaining way, using traditional exhibition resources and new technologies.

The project

The Valencia History Museum (MhV) was created by agreement of the Commission of Government of the Valencia City Council on January 12, 2001. Its mission is to promote the history of the city, from its origins to the present day, using elements of the local archaeological, artistic, and cultural heritage.
The MhV aims to present the history of Valencia to visitors, portraying that history as something tangible, intelligible, and entertaining, while also giving perspective to political history, dates, battles or famous historic figures and focusing on social background, economic motives, ideology, and tradition.

MhV was proclaimed "Cultural Project of the Year" by the “Diputación de Valencia” in 2003.

The building

The museum is located inside the first underground reservoir of drinking water in Valencia, which was built by Ildefonso Cerdá (who later designed the Eixample of Barcelona) and Leodegario Marchessaux. The reservoir was inaugurated in 1850 and was the first of its kind in Spain. Built entirely in brick, it is an example of nineteenth-century Valencian industrial architecture. The restoration of the building was performed by the City Council between 1998 and 2001.

Despite the museum being relatively out of reach of the Old City, the neighbouring Parque de Cabecera, less than 100 meters away, provides easy access to the city centre.

On display
The MhV's permanent exhibition is dedicated to the history of Valencia, divided into eight time periods:

 	
      Valentia (138 b.c.-711)
  	Balansiya (711-1238)
  	Valencia in the Middle ages (1238-1519)
  	The “Germanías” to the “Nueva Planta” (1519-1707)
  	Borbonicus municipality (1707-1833)
  	The City of Steam (1833-1917)
  	Truncated Modernity (1917-1975) and
  	The Valencia we have known (1975-2003)

Each time period shows a collection of objects, documents and works of art which bear witness to their time. In the centre of each block, there are two stands reconstructing historical settings of the city and projecting everyday scenes related to each period, so the visitor can choose any scene at will and get to know historical characters, by immersion in each world of experiences and aspirations. This format blends elements of a museum and a cinema, providing textual information through more dynamic media.

Visitors can see everyday scenes relating to circumstances and characters of different periods, thus being able to get to know the protagonists of the history of Valencia.

The showcases present a varied collection, ranging from archaeological objects to artistic works, archival documents, books, prints, maps, posters, machines, vehicles or toys, among others, collected not so much for their individual value as for their ability to evoke moments and contexts in history.

Moreover, the MhV hosts regular temporary exhibitions on Valencia in general, and its history in particular, and offers an educational program for all audiences, which includes guided tours or workshops.

The museum is equipped to recreate, using virtual reality, the appearance of the city throughout its twenty-two centuries of history in “La máquina del tiempo (The Time Machine)”. The visitor can choose a time zone and browse it to get a bird's eye view, obtaining an avalanche of historical data on the city at any point along the way.

The “Mediateca (media library)”, finally, is a space designed for relaxation and reflection, where the visitor can enjoy hearing recited poetry or musical fragments from every moment in history, see old photos of Valencia and its inhabitants or freely consult a carefully chosen selection of works on the city.

External links
 

Museums in Valencia